
Year 571 (DLXXI) was a common year starting on Thursday (link will display the full calendar) of the Julian calendar. The denomination 571 for this year has been used since the early medieval period, when the Anno Domini calendar era became the prevalent method in Europe for naming years.

Events 
 By place 

 Europe 
 The Visigoths under King Liuvigild invade the Byzantine province of Spania (modern Andalusia), and seize the city of Córdoba.   After the death of his brother Liuva I, he becomes sole ruler of the Visigothic Kingdom (approximate date). 
 Benevento becomes the capital of an independent duchy, under the Lombard chieftain Zotto (approximate date).

 Britain 
 Battle of Bedcanford: The Anglo-Saxons under King Cuthwulf fight against the Britons, and conquer the settlements of Aylesbury, Benson, Eynsham and Limbury (according to the Anglo-Saxon Chronicle).
 Wuffa becomes the first king of East Anglia, as recorded in the Anglo-Saxon royal genealogies (approximate date).

 By topic 

 Religion 
 The Monophysites again reject the Council of Chalcedon, causing another schism.

Births 
 Muhammad, prophet of Islam (d. 632) – see also 570
 Li Jing, general and chancellor of the Tang Dynasty (d. 649)
 Wang Gui, chancellor of the Tang Dynasty (d. 639)
 Yang Jun, prince of the Sui Dynasty (d. 600)

Deaths 
 April 15 – Kinmei, emperor of Japan (b. 509)
 November 29? – Brendan of Birr, Irish monastic saint
 Fall – killed in dynastic intrigue
 Gao Yan, prince of Northern Qi (b. 558) 
 He Shikai, high official of Northern Qi (b. 524)
 Liuva I, king of the Visigoths (or 572)
 May 20 – Saint Yared, Axumite composer (b. 505)

References